Holt Town is a tram stop on the East Manchester Line (EML) of Greater Manchester's light-rail Metrolink system. The station opened on 11 February 2013, after a three-day free trial for local residents, as part of Phase 3a of the Metrolink's expansion.  It is beside the River Medlock in Holt Town, between Ancoats and Bradford.

Services

Services are mostly every 12 minutes on all routes.

Connecting bus routes
Holt Town is served by Stagecoach Manchester services 216 and 231, which both stop nearby on Ashton New Road. Service 216 replicates the tram route between Piccadilly Gardens and Droylsden before continuing to Ashton-under-Lyne, while the 231 runs from Manchester to Ashton via Littlemoss and Smallshaw.

References

External links

Holt Town Stop Information
Holt Town area map
 Light Rail Transit Association

Tram stops in Manchester
Tram stops on the Bury to Ashton-under-Lyne line